Bereniceidae is a family of bryozoans belonging to the order Cyclostomatida.

Genera:
 Berenicea Lamouroux, 1821

References

Bryozoan families